Syagrius intrudens  is a species of weevil native to Europe.

References

Curculionidae
Beetles described in 1903
Beetles of Europe